Baxter Byerly "Buck" Jordan (January 16, 1907 – March 18, 1993) was a first baseman in Major League Baseball who played for the New York Giants (1927–1929), Washington Senators (1931), Boston Braves (1932–1937), Cincinnati Reds (1937-1938) and Philadelphia Phillies (1938). Jordan batted left-handed and threw right-handed. He was born in Cooleemee, North Carolina.

A solid defensive first baseman and basically a line-drive hitter, Jordan posted high batting averages in the minor leagues, but his lack of power made him nothing to be feared at the major league level. After playing in part of three seasons with the Giants and Senators, he became a regular with the Boston Braves in 1933 as he twice topped .300, with a career-high .323 in 1936. After that he averaged .290 in the next three seasons, that included stints with the Reds and Phillies. Twice he collected eight hits in a doubleheader, for the Braves in 1936 and with the Phillies in 1938.

In a ten-season career, Jordan was a .299 hitter with 17 home runs and 281 RBI in 811 games played.

Jordan died in Salisbury, North Carolina, at age 86.

External links

1907 births
1993 deaths
People from Cooleemee, North Carolina
Boston Braves players
Cincinnati Reds players
New York Giants (NL) players
Philadelphia Phillies players
Washington Senators (1901–1960) players
Major League Baseball first basemen
Baseball players from North Carolina